Comanche Territory  is a 1950 American Western film directed by George Sherman and starring Maureen O'Hara and Macdonald Carey. Jim Bowie is sent into Comanche country on a mission to allow the government to mine silver on the Indian's land.

Plot
An Indian treaty prevents settlers setting up camp on Comanche territory, but silver has been found and the government has sent Jim Bowie (Macdonald Carey) and Dan'l Seeger (Will Geer) to negotiate a new treaty to allow the precious metal to be mined.

Bowie soon finds that settlers are planning a raid on the Comanche, all instigated by saloon owner Katie Howard (Maureen O'Hara) and her crooked brother Stacey (Charles Drake). Katie falls in love with Bowie and turns honest, but it may be too late to prevent another Indian war.

Cast
 Maureen O'Hara as Katie Howard
 Macdonald Carey as James Bowie
 Will Geer as Dan'l Seeger
 Charles Drake as Stacey Howard
 Pedro de Cordoba as Quisima
 Ian MacDonald as Walsh
 Rick Vallin as Pakanah
 Parley Baer as Boozer, the bartender
 James Best as Sam
 Edmund Cobb as Ed

Production
In March 1949, Universal announced they would make a biopic of Jim Bowie produced by Leonard Goldstein, most likely to star Scott Brady as Bowie. The film was originally called The Bowie Knife. It was O'Hara's second film for Universal, following Bagdad (1949), and co-star Macdonald Carey's second film on loan from Paramount, following South Sea Sinner (1950).

Location work was done at Kanab, Utah, but location shooting took place in and around the Oak Creek Canyon area of Arizona. Filming was postponed a week in August 1949 so O'Hara could recover from laryngitis.

References

External links
 
 
 
 

1950 films
Films directed by George Sherman
1950 Western (genre) films
American Western (genre) films
Films set in the 1830s
Films scored by Frank Skinner
Universal Pictures films
1950s English-language films
1950s American films
Cultural depictions of James Bowie